Armaan Ebrahim (born 17 May 1989) is a car racer from Chennai, India.

Background and personal life
Armaan was born in an Indian Muslim family, the son of Akbar Ebrahim, a former F3 champion. The family is based in Chennai, Tamil Nadu.

In December 2021, Armaan Ebrahim married Anushpala Kamineni, daughter of Anil and Shobana Kamineni, in an elaborate Hindu religious ceremony. Born into a Telugu speaking Hindu family, Anushpala is the daughter of Anil Kamineni, a Hyderabad-based businessman. Anushpala's mother, Shobana Kamineni, is a daughter of Prathap Reddy, founder of Apollo Hospitals. Anushpala has one sister, Upasana, who is the wife of Telugu film star Ram Charan, himself the son of superstar Chiranjeevi.

Career
Ebrahim started his career in karting and became Formula LGB Champion in 2004. He later moved to Formula BMW Asia for the 2005 season. During the same year he represented A1 Team India in the A1 Grand Prix Championship, driving in 6 races, before the team was disbanded due to lack of funds. He again drove for A1 Team India Part Season in the 2006–07 A1 Grand Prix season. In 2007 he also drove in Formula V6 Asia where he captured five race wins and finished second in points.

He drove for the David Price Racing team in the 2008 GP2 Asia Series where he finished 26th in points with a best finish of 9th position.

On 12 December 2008 Ebrahim was announced as the first (and ultimately, only) Asian driver to sign up for the rebirth of FIA Formula Two in 2009, driving car number six. He finished seventeenth in points, with two sixth-place finishes at Brno being his best results. The Formula Two website rated Armaan as the "Driver with the Best Race Form". On an average Armaan overtook 8 cars per race in Formula 2. The second best driver was Edoardo Piscopo who managed an average of 5. Ebrahim returned to FIA Formula Two in 2010 driving for MotorSport Vision. He captured his first F2 podium finish at Circuit de Valencia and improved to tenth in points. He returned to the series and team in 2011 but left the series after twelve of the sixteen races. He had a best finish of sixth and finished 15th in points.

In 2012 Ebrahim signed to race in the American Firestone Indy Lights series for the new Fan Force United team owned by former IndyCar Series driver Tyce Carlson. Ebrahim and the team mutually parted ways after five races. He had a best finish of 8th in the season opener and ultimately wound up 13th in the championship.

Ebrahim is popular in the Indian media and featured on a special programme on national television with former F1 superstar David Coulthard, during the latter's visit to India in October, 2009.

Ebrahim has competed for BMW Auto Service Team India in the FIA GT Series, which began on 1 April 2013.

Ebrahim competed in 2014 Blancpain Sprint Series season with Team Fortec Motorsport where he secured seven podiums in the silver cup.

X1 Racing
In 2019, with fellow Indian driver, Aditya Patel, Ebrahim created the X1 Racing, the world's first professional franchise-based motorsport league.

Racing record

Career summary

† As Ebrahim was a guest driver, he was ineligible to score points

Complete A1 Grand Prix results
(key) (Races in bold indicate pole position) (Races in italics indicate fastest lap)

Complete GP2 Asia Series results
(key) (Races in bold indicate pole position) (Races in italics indicate fastest lap)

Complete FIA Formula Two Championship results
(key) (Races in bold indicate pole position) (Races in italics indicate fastest lap)

American open–wheel racing results 
(key)

Indy Lights

References

External links
Armaan Ebrahim's Official Website
Armaan Ebrahim's Official Facebook Page

1989 births
Living people
Tamil sportspeople
Indian racing drivers
Formula BMW Asia drivers
A1 Team India drivers
British Formula Renault 2.0 drivers
Formula V6 Asia drivers
GP2 Asia Series drivers
FIA Formula Two Championship drivers
Indy Lights drivers
JK Tyre National Level Racing Championship drivers
A1 Grand Prix drivers
David Price Racing drivers
Fear Factor: Khatron Ke Khiladi participants
Arena Motorsport drivers
Van Amersfoort Racing drivers
German Formula Three Championship drivers
Fortec Motorsport drivers
Lamborghini Super Trofeo drivers